Miss India Worldwide 1998 was the eighth edition of the international beauty pageant. The final was held in Singapore, December 3, 1998. About 18 countries were represented in the pageant. Melissa Bhagat of Canada was crowned as winner at the end of the event.

Results

Special awards

Delegates

 – Melissa Bhagat
 – Pinky Harwani
 – Sonisha Kirpalani
 – Himani Isar
 – Shanti Tolani
 – Kathleen Cyril
 – Leena Ramphul
 – Gogi Ishani
 – Reshma Sharina Tewarles
 – Sureen Bhagawandas
 –  Ssunita Laximi Rai
 – Sunitha Singh
 – Shamla Mathoera
 – Somatie Natacha Persad
 – Shital Tolani
 – Sharon Jutla
 – Nileem Shah
 – Jeshmeen Kanjee

References

External links
http://www.worldwidepageants.com/

1998 beauty pageants